Zona Central can refer to:

 Zona Central, Chile
 Zona Central, Rio de Janeiro, Brazil
 Downtown São Paulo, Brazil